Ba, Fiji may refer to:

 Ba Province, a province of Fiji
 Ba District, Fiji, within Ba Province
 Ba (town), within Ba Province
 Ba River (Fiji)